Oyanagi may refer to:

Ryōta Oyanagi (born 1993), Japanese sumo wrestler now known as Yutakayama Ryōta 
Kinya Oyanagi (born 1976), retired Japanese professional wrestler
Oyanagi Station, a railway station on the Hokuriku Railroad Ishikawa Line in Hakusan, Ishikawa